Johannes Reich-Rohrwig (born 4 November 1954 in Linz, Upper Austria) is an Austrian lawyer and a partner at the Vienna-based law firm CMS Reich-Rohrwig Hainz Rechtsanwälte GmbH. In his legal practice, he focuses on business and corporate law. He is also a lecturer at the University of Vienna and serves on numerous supervisory boards and boards of trustees.

Life 
Reich-Rohrwig studied law at the University of Vienna and received a doctorate (Dr. iur.) in 1977. He was admitted to the bar in Austria in 1983. In 2004, he completed his habilitation at the Faculty of Law of the University of Vienna, acquiring the qualifications of an associate professor. In 2008, he received the title of university professor. In 2014, a Festschrift was published by Bernhard Hainz and Heinz Krejci on the occasion of Reich-Rohrwig's 60th birthday.

Johannes Reich-Rohrwig is one of the two lawyers after whom the law firm CMS Reich-Rohrwig Hainz, which operates in Austria and CEE, is named. Reich-Rohrwig is specialised in commercial and corporate law and advises clients on inheritance and succession matters. In addition to his work as a lawyer, he regularly serves as an arbitrator or chairman of arbitral tribunals.

Johannes Reich-Rohrwig was a member of a preparatory committee charged with working out amendments to the Austrian corporate act. He was also involved in the further development of the Austrian limited liability companies act: it was Reich-Rohrwig who proposed the extension to third-party managers of the right to bring dismissal action (section 16 subsection 2), regulations on resignation (section 16a), the managing directors’ duty of disclosure (section 24a), the extension of the right to dismiss supervisory board members for good reason (section 30b subsection 5) and the simplified capital decrease (sections 54ff.) in the framework of said act. He furthermore collaborated in the reform of the Austrian act on reorganisations (mergers, divisions, conversions) made necessary by the Austrian EU company law amendment act of 1996 as part of a working committee of the Austrian Federal Ministry of Justice. He also published a book on this topic. In 2015, Reich-Rohrwig advised on the statutory introduction of the Business Judgement Rule according to section 84 of the Austrian public limited companies act and section 25 of the Austrian limited liability companies act.

He co-founded the Austrian legal journal Wirtschaftsrechtliche Blätter in 1989 and ecolex, a commercial law magazine, in 1990. He has headed the corporate law section of said magazine since its establishment.

In 2008 and 2015, Reich-Rohrwig published extensive commentaries on the liability (accountability) of managing directors of limited liability companies in a leading subject-specific publication.

He is a lecturer at the Department of Commercial and Business Law of the University of Vienna, teaching the following subjects: selected topics of corporate law, contract design in M&A, practical contract design in business and corporate law.

Publications 
Johannes Reich-Rohrwig has published more than 200 works in his field of expertise. His first book, Das österreichische GmbH Recht [The Austrian limited liability companies act], published in 1983, and his habilitation thesis titled Grundsatzfragen der Kapitalerhaltung bei AG, GmbH sowie GmbH & Co. KG [Fundamental questions of capital retention in AG, GmbH and GmbH & Co. KG], which he completed in 2004, are both considered authoritative commentaries in the field. The Austrian Supreme Court of Justice has cited legal opinions held by Reich-Rohrwig in numerous cases.

Selected works

 Erbrecht 2017: Richtig vererben, Fehler vermeiden (Succession Law 2017: A guide to planning your succession and avoiding mistakes), 1st Edition, Linde 2016
 Das Österreichische GmbH-Recht [The Austrian limited liability companies act], first edition, MANZ 1983; second edition, vol. 1, MANZ 1997
 EU-Gesellschaftsrechtsänderungsgesetz [EU company law amendment act], MANZ 1996
 Unternehmens- und Anteilsübertragung aus zivil- und gesellschaftsrechtlicher Sicht in Unternehmensnachfolge [Business and share transfers in corporate successions from a civil and corporate law perspective], published by Bank Austria, 1999, p. 10ff.
 Sanierung durch vereinfachte Kapitalherabsetzung und -erhöhung [Restructuring by means of a simplified capital decrease and increase], GesRZ 2001, p. 69ff.
 Grundsatzfragen der Kapitalerhaltung bei AG, GmbH sowie GmbH & Co KG, [Fundamental questions of capital retention in AG, GmbH and GmbH & Co. KG] MANZ 2004
 Societas Europea – SE, MANZ 2006
 Kapitalerhöhung bei der börsennotierten AG in Österreich [Capital increase in listed public limited companies in Austria], Festschrift for Günther H. Roth, 2011, p. 635ff.
 Handbuch Generalversammlung der GmbH [Manual for the general meeting of the limited liability company], jointly published with Oliver Ginthör und Martin Gratzl, MANZ 2014
 Auslegung und Reichweite von Bilanzgarantien [Interpretation and scope of accounts warranties], in Althuber/Schopper (eds.), Handbuch Unternehmenskauf, second edition, 2015, p. 391ff.

References

1954 births
Living people
People from Linz
University of Vienna alumni
Lawyers from Vienna